Daniel Doran may refer to:
 Daniel Doran (cricketer)
 Daniel Doran (figure skater)